
Brooklands College is a further education college in Weybridge and Ashford, England.

In August 2007 Brooklands merged with Spelthorne College in Ashford. The Weybridge campus is in the grounds of Hugh F. Locke King's historic mansion at Brooklands; the Ashford campus is adjacent to Sir Thomas Knyvett School, Ashford.

The college provides courses for those leaving school after GCSEs, vocational subjects, A-levels, apprenticeships, and professional courses for adults including foundation degrees.

There are approximately 5,000 students attending the college; of these about 2,500 are full-time.

Alumni

 Tom Chilton, racing driver
 Robert Evans, Labour MEP for London, 1994-2009
 Martin Freeman, actor
 Gary Numan, musician
 Arthur Palmer, Labour MP 1945-50 for Wimbledon; 1952-9 for Cleveland; 1964-74 for Bristol Central,; 1974-83 for Bristol North East
 Lucie Silvas, singer-songwriter
 Wendy Smith-Sly, athlete who competed mainly in the 3,000 metres; silver medallist at the 1984 Olympics in Los Angeles; 1983 World Champion in the World 10 km road race championship
 Irene Thomas
 Norman Willis, General Secretary of the TUC, 1984–93
 Sean Lock , Stand-up comedian & TV panel show regular.
 James Purefoy, actor.

In popular culture
 The 2007 film, I Want Candy, starring Carmen Electra, was filmed at Brooklands College.
 Four members of the pop punk band You Me at Six attended Brooklands College.
A 2018 Waitrose Christmas advert was filmed at Brooklands College

References

External links
 

Further education colleges in Surrey